Joe Kodeih (born September 3, 1967 in Ashrafieh, Beirut) is a writer, actor and director. He was the first writer and director from the Arab world to perform on an Off-Broadway stage at Lamama ETC in 2003 with a play titled The Middle Beast. The play was acclaimed by the audience and rerun at Monnot theater in Beirut in 2008, when the writer received many threats for its content. Joe's plays were performed all over Europe, the Middle East and Africa. One of his plays "Son prénom malgre lui" was published at Lansman editions in Belgium.

Education
Kodeih obtained his B.A. (1995) in Dramatic Arts, M.A. (1998) in Directing and M.A. (2020) in Drama Theory from the Saint Joseph University in Lebanon.

Body Of Work
2020: Emm El-Kell, socio-political monologue, written, performed and produced, Beirut

2019: The Middle Beast, socio-political satire, written, directed and produced, Beirut, Tunis

2018: Abou el-Ghadab, monologue, written, performed and produced, Beirut

2017: Btetol, based on Petits Crimes Conjugaux of Schmidt, adapted, directed and produced, Beirut

2016: La Peau d’Elisa, written by Carole Frechette, directed and produced, Beirut

2016: Les Liaisons Dangereuses, written by Choderlos de Laclos, adapted, directed and produced, Beirut

2015: Daddy, monologue, written, performed and produced, Beirut, Paris

2014: Rima, tragicomedy monologue, written, directed and produced, Beirut

2014: Michel wu Samir, political satire, written, directed and produced, Beirut

2013: Le Jocon, monologue, written, performed and produced, Beirut, Paris

2012: Film Cinama, monologue, written, performed and produced, Beirut, Paris

2011: ANA, monologue, written, performed and produced, Beirut, Paris, Abu Dhabi, Kuwait, Luxembourg

2010: Bala Mazeh, comedy TV show on LBCI, written and produced, Beirut

2010: Ashrafieh, monologue, written, performed and produced, Beirut, Paris, Dubai

2009: Hayet el Jagal Sobeh, monologue, written, performed & produced, Beirut, Dubai, Paris, Luxembourg

2008: The Middle Beast, socio-political satire, written, directed and produced, Beirut

2006: El Bagno, drama, written, directed and produced, Beirut, Tunis

2003: The Middle Beast, socio-political satire, written and directed, first Lebanese work to stage Off-  Broadway at Lamama ETC. New York

2002: Mamooshka, surrealist play, written, staged at Labalsamine Theater in Brussels 

2001: Aal Yamine, post-war play, written, directed and produced, Beirut, Paris

2000: Son Prénom Malgré Lui, post-war play, written, published by Lansman publishers in Belgium, Staged in Brussels, Geneva, Senegal, Côte d'Ivoire

2000: Al-Takht, satire, written, directed and produced, Beirut

1999: Europa, experimental play, written and directed, Bologna, Marseille 

1999: Matar Charles De Gaulle, monologue, written and directed, Beirut

1998: Kiss of the Spider Woman, written by Manuel Puig, adapted and directed, Beirut

1997: Scènes d’amour, retrospective on theatre history, written and directed, Beirut, Avignon Festival

1996: Pascal and Descartes, written by Jean Claude Briseville, directed, Beirut 

1995: La Soirée des Proverbes, written by George Schéhadé, directed, Beirut

References

External links 
 

1967 births
Living people
Lebanese male television actors
Lebanese male actors